Olivier O. Provosty (August 3, 1852 – August 3, 1924) was a justice of the Louisiana Supreme Court from March 16, 1901, to December 30, 1922, serving as chief justice from January 2, 1922, until the end of his service.

Born in Pointe Coupee Parish, Louisiana, Provosty was educated at the Poydras Academy, and at Georgetown University.

He was a district attorney from 1873 to 1876, and served in the Louisiana State Senate from 1888 to 1892, and as a member of the Constitutional Convention of 1898. He was a referee in bankruptcy from 1898 to 1901.

Provosty died in his home in New Orleans on his 72nd birthday. He was survived by a son and four daughters.

References

1852 births
1924 deaths
Justices of the Louisiana Supreme Court
People from Pointe Coupee Parish, Louisiana
Georgetown University alumni
Louisiana state senators